Endomyzostomatidae is a family of polychaetes belonging to the order Myzostomida.

Genera:
 Endomyzostoma Perrier, 1897
 Mycomyzostoma Eeckhaut, 1998

References

Polychaetes